Highway 311 (AR 311, Ark. 311, and Hwy. 311) is a north–south state highway in Carroll County, Arkansas. The route of  runs from Industrial Park Drive in Green Forest north across US 62 through rural Carroll County to Highway 21 in Blue Eye.

Route description
AR 311 begins in Green Forest at Industrial Park Drive. The route runs north and forms a concurrency with US 62 west for  before turning north. Highway 311 begins to wind through rural areas in Carroll County, including Farewell, before terminating at AR 21 in Blue Eye.

History
The route was designated a state highway under the jurisdiction of the Arkansas State Highway and Transportation Department (AHTD) between 1961 and 1963. The route is entirely two–lane undivided.

Major intersections
Mile markers reset at concurrencies.

|-
| align=center colspan=3 |  concurrency west, 
|-

See also

 List of state highways in Arkansas

References

External links

311
Transportation in Carroll County, Arkansas